Massachusetts House of Representatives' 10th Suffolk district in the United States is one of 160 legislative districts included in the lower house of the Massachusetts General Court. It covers part of Brookline in Norfolk County and part of Boston in Suffolk County. Democrat Ed Coppinger of West Roxbury has represented the district since 2011.

The current district geographic boundary overlaps with those of the Massachusetts Senate's 1st Middlesex and Norfolk district and Norfolk and Suffolk district.

Representatives
 Solomon J. Gordon, circa 1858 
 William Makepeace, circa 1858 
 Moses Kimball, circa 1859 
 Nathaniel C. Nash, circa 1859 
 Edward P. Fisk, circa 1888 
 Jacob Fottler, circa 1888 
 Robert E. Bigney, circa 1920 
 William H. McDonnell, circa 1920 
 Timothy J. McInerney, circa 1951 
 David John O'Connor, circa 1951 
 Philip Anthony Tracy, circa 1951 
 Mary H. Goode, circa 1975 
 Mike Rush, 2002 – January 2011
 Edward F. Coppinger, 2011-current

See also
 List of Massachusetts House of Representatives elections
 Other Suffolk County districts of the Massachusetts House of Representatives: 1st, 2nd, 3rd, 4th, 5th, 6th, 7th, 8th, 9th, 11th, 12th, 13th, 14th, 15th, 16th, 17th, 18th, 19th
 List of Massachusetts General Courts
 List of former districts of the Massachusetts House of Representatives

Images
Portraits of legislators

References

External links
 Ballotpedia
  (State House district information based on U.S. Census Bureau's American Community Survey).
 League of Women Voters of Brookline
 League of Women Voters of Boston

House
Government of Suffolk County, Massachusetts
Government of Norfolk County, Massachusetts